Conchil-le-Temple is a commune in the Pas-de-Calais department in the Hauts-de-France region of France.

Geography
A large village situated some 8 miles (17 km) southwest of Montreuil-sur-Mer on the D940E1 and D143 road junction.  A rural, wooded area featuring many lakes and nature trails to walk and ride.

History
It has been known by various names over the centuries: in 845 as Concilium, in 1406 as Conchy-les-Waben and by 1608 as Conchie.

Conchil was listed among the possessions of the abbey of Saint Riquier in the 9th century. A house known as ’’’Temple-lez-Waben’’’ was a commandery of the Templars. In 1307, two Templars from here (Raoul Monteswis and Eudes of Écuires) were captured and burnt at the stake at nearby Montreuil.

As with much of this region of France, the wars of the 15th century caused major devastation. The mill, temple and many buildings were destroyed.

The church, dedicated to Saint Blaise, had been established at Conchil since ancient times. In 1686, the Bishop of Amiens gave a relic of the saint to the church, which was the object of great veneration. Many pilgrims came to Conchil each February 3 and the days after, invoked St. Blaise to cure their sore throats.

It is claimed that the pavilion is the former prison of Waben. It is a square building with very thick walls. Large metal rings, possibly used for shackling prisoners, can still be seen in the underground parts.

Places of interest
 The 15th – eighteenth century church of the Nativité-de-Notre-Dame.

Population

See also
Communes of the Pas-de-Calais department

References

Conchilletemple